Cerconota trizeucta is a moth in the family Depressariidae. It was described by Edward Meyrick in 1930. It is found in Brazil (Para).

References

Moths described in 1930
Cerconota
Taxa named by Edward Meyrick